Hamster Vice is an American comic book series by Dwayne Ferguson. The first issue, of fourteen, was published in 1986, when Dwayne Ferguson (born 1965) was aged 19 and a "Rutgers University sophomore". It's a parody of the then popular TV series Miami Vice.

Publication history

The first series was published by Blackthorne Publishing and appeared in June 1986.  It ran for nine issues with two 3-D specials and an appearance in Blackthorne's Laffin' Gas #4 in December 1986.  The comic moved to Eternity Comics (a division of Malibu Comics) in April 1989 for its second volume which lasted two issues.

References 

1986 comics debuts
1989 comics endings
Fictional hamsters
Fictional police officers in comics
Comics based on television series
Comics about police officers
Anthropomorphic animal characters
Parody comics
Comics about animals
Parodies of television shows
Blackthorne Publishing titles
Malibu Comics titles
Comics characters introduced in 1986